Walford Williams (born 1 January 1952) is a Jamaican cricketer. He played in one first-class match for the Jamaican cricket team in 1979/80.

See also
 List of Jamaican representative cricketers

References

External links
 

1952 births
Living people
Jamaican cricketers
Jamaica cricketers
People from Portland Parish